Federal Government College, Ikot Ekpene (FGCIK) is a secondary school located in Ikot Ekpene, Akwa Ibom State, Nigeria. The school was created by the Nigerian government in 1973 as one of the federally funded "Unity schools" to bring together students from regions across Nigeria. The school has facilities for both boarding and day students. Students (boys and girls) range from Junior Secondary One (JS1) through Senior Secondary Three (SS3). Students must complete the Federal Common Entrance Exams in order to apply for attendance.

Federal Government College Ikot Ekpene has very strong alumni associations in the United Kingdom, United States and Nigeria with the Lagos chapter being the most active alumni association.

Houses

Past principals
Mr Bryan R. Kimmitt (late)
Mr J. T. Udofia (First Nigerian Principal)
Mr Efekodo
Mr S W Obot (Late)
Prince O A Oyetola 
Mr Odumu
Lady I J Udoh (1996 - 2001)
Dr M A Idienumah (2001 - 2010)
Mrs C. J. Umamah (2010 - 2012)
Mr S. A Odo (2012 - 2016)

Benefactors
Mobil Producing Nigeria Unlimited (MPNU), Ibeno (Upstream subsidiary of Exxonmobil corporation) - They donated and serviced a heavy-duty diesel generator that sustained the whole school from 1996.
FGC Ikot Ekpene UK Alumni - They offer yearly prizes to the best JSS and SSS student. 
The UK Alumni also donated computers to the school in 2006.
Ex-Student and President of the Akwa Ibom State branch of the Old Students' Association, Ubokutom Nyah  (Class of 1980) donated the sum of =N=150,000 for the renovation of Niger House. He also made a donation of =N=100,000 to support sports development in the college.
FGC Ikot Ekpene UK Alumni - Sinking a borehole well to provide water to the Boys' hostel (2008)
In 2017, the 1992 set sank boreholes, bought water tanks and placed proper electrification all over the school premises.

Notable alumni
Some of FGC Ikot Ekpene's most well-known alumni include:

Rita Dominic - Nollywood Actress
 Senator Adawari Pepple - Senator of the Federal Republic of Nigeria
 Hon Samuel Ikon - Member of the House of Representatives of Nigeria.
 Mark Essien - Nigerian entrepreneur, Software Developer, Startup Investor, Founder and CEO of Hotels.ng

FGC Ikot Ekpene - Class of 2014
The alumni class of 2014 held a Get-to-Together Dinner Party in Uyo.

List of alumni associations
 FGC IK United Kingdom Alumni
 FGC IK Alumni, Lagos - President: Ify Essien - Akpan
 FGC IK Alumni, Uyo
 FGC IK Alumni, Abuja and North
 FGC IK Alumni, Aba
 FGC IK Alumni, Onitsha
 FGC IK Alumni Portharcourt
 FGC IKOT EKPENE CLASS OF 2005

Publications
FGC Ikot-Ekpene is the publisher of The GEM Magazine. The Editor-in-Chief is Iroegbu Udoka. Other members of the editorial board are Mrs. M.M Essiet, Mr E.O. George and Mr. N.T. Agu.

External links
Federal Government College, Ikot Ekpene Facebook Page
Federal Government College, Ikot Ekpene 1976 - 1981 Set
Federal Government College, Ikot Ekpene - Class of 1983
Federal Government College, Ikot Ekpene - Class of 1991
Federal Government College, Ikot Ekpene- Class of 1992
Federal Government College, Ikot Ekpene - Class of 2000
Federal Government College, Ikot Ekpene- Class of 2002
Federal Government College, Ikot Ekpene - Class of 2003
Federal Government College, Ikot Ekpene - Class of 2006
Federal Government College, Ikot Ekpene - Lagos Alumni
Federal Government College Old student & Classmate Network Alumni Website 
School location on WikiMapia
Federal Government College, Ikot Ekpene - Class of 2005

See also 

Federal Government College Enugu
Federal Government College, Idoani
Federal Government College Lagos
Federal Government Girls College, Benin City

References

1973 establishments in Nigeria
Educational institutions established in 1973
Secondary schools in Nigeria
Schools in Akwa Ibom State
Government schools in Nigeria